Phitak Pimpae (born January 14, 2000) is a Thai professional footballer who plays as a winger for Thai League 1 club Chonburi.

References

External links
Phitak Pimpae at Soccerway

2000 births
Living people
Phitak Pimpae
Phitak Pimpae
Association football midfielders
Phitak Pimpae
Phitak Pimpae